Phillip Leon "Chip" Myers (July 9, 1945 in Panama City, Florida – February 23, 1999) was a National Football league wide receiver for the Cincinnati Bengals and San Francisco 49ers.

Early life
Myers attended Northwestern Oklahoma State University in Alva, Oklahoma.

Playing career
Myers was selected in the 10th round (248th overall) of the 1967 NFL Draft. The wide receiver saw little action in 12 games, with two receptions for 13 yards.

During the 1968 season, he played minor league football with the (Huntsville) Alabama Hawks of the Continental Football League, where he averaged almost 22 yards per catch.

In 1969, he signed with the American Football League Cincinnati Bengals. In his first year with the team, he played in all 14 games, starting five at wide receiver. He had 10 receptions for 205 yards (a 20.5 average) and two touchdowns.

In 1970, he became an integral part of the now-NFL's Bengals offense and quarterback Virgil Carter. In 14 games, he started eight and totaled a team-leading 32 receptions for 542 yards (a 16.9 average) and two touchdowns.

The following year, 1971, he was hampered by injuries and played 10 games, starting seven, and had 27 receptions for 286 yards (a 10.6 average) and one touchdown.

He bounced back in 1972 with his best-ever season. With Ken Anderson now the Bengals starting quarterback, Myers started all 14 games with a team-leading 57 receptions for 792 yards (a 13.9 average) and three touchdowns. He ranked third in the NFL in total receptions and seventh in receiving yards. His performance earned him a spot on the 1972 Pro Bowl squad.

However, in 1973 he was again beset by injuries, playing only five games and starting four. He had seven receptions for 77 yards (an 11.0 average).

In 1974, he bounced back again and fellow wide receivers Isaac Curtis and Charlie Joiner, tight end Bob Trumpy, Myers and quarterback Anderson gave the Bengals one of the best passing attacks in the NFL. Playing all 14 games and starting three, he had a team-leading 32 receptions for 383 yards (a 12.0 average) and one touchdown.

In 1975, Myers played in 13 games, starting two, with 36 receptions for 527 yards (a 14.6 average) and three touchdowns.

The 1976 season would be his last. He played in 12 games, starting four, with 17 receptions for 267 yards (a 15.7 average) and one touchdown. During that final season he caught the longest pass of his career, a 63-yarder from Anderson

Coaching career
Myers served as an assistant coach with the Minnesota Vikings for four seasons coaching receivers 1995-97 and quarterbacks in 1998. In January 1999 he was promoted to the team's offensive coordinator when Brian Billick left to become head coach of the Baltimore Ravens. In February, Myers had spent a week in Hawaii with the rest of the Vikings coaches for the Pro Bowl, and had been with the staff in Indianapolis on the weekend of February 20 for the NFL scouting combine.

However, he died suddenly at age 53 of a heart attack February 23, 1999 at his home in Long Lake, Minnesota. He was survived by his wife, Susie, and five adult children.

Myers received much credit for the development of quarterback Randall Cunningham, who said, ""He was a big part of my success, and I'll carry the teachings and things I've learned from him onto the field each game." "I don't think there was anybody in this building who was loved more than he was," said defensive coordinator Foge Fazio, who worked with Myers seven of the last eight season with the New York Jets and Vikings.

References

See also 
Other American Football League players

1945 births
1999 deaths
People from Panama City, Florida
American football wide receivers
Northwestern Oklahoma State Rangers football players
San Francisco 49ers players
Cincinnati Bengals players
American Conference Pro Bowl players
Minnesota Vikings coaches
Tampa Bay Buccaneers coaches
People from Long Lake, Minnesota
American Football League players